Tom Buis is a former president of the American National Farmers Union (NFU) and served as CEO of Growth Energy until 2015. Before moving to NFU, Buis served as the Senior Agriculture Policy Advisor for Senate Majority Leader Tom Daschle (D-S.D.).

Early life
Tom Buis grew up on the family farm with this brothers Mike and Jeff in Putnam and Morgan Counties, West Central Indiana. After completing his education, he became a full-time grain and livestock farmer in Indiana.

Public service
In 1987, Buis moved to Washington, D.C. where he worked as a legislative assistant and legislative director for U.S. Representative Jim Jontz (D-Ind.), and as special assistant for agriculture to U.S. Senator Birch Bayh (D-Ind.). He served for nearly five years as senior agricultural policy adviser to Senate Majority Leader Tom Daschle (D-S.D).

National Farmers Union
Buis began work with the National Farmers Union in 1998. He served as vice president of government relations and was elected president 2006 and again in 2008. He stepped down to become CEO of Growth Energy.

Growth Energy
Buis joined Growth Energy as CEO in March 2009 and served until July 2015. After stepping down as CEO, Buis went on to serve as Co-Chair of the Board.

Growth Energy is an interest group representing the interests of the ethanol industry.  Gen. Wesley Clark and Jim Nussle, former U.S. Congressman from Iowa and OMB Director in President George W. Bush's cabinet have also served as representatives for Growth Energy. In May 2009, Buis was selected as one of Washington's top 50 lobbyist by TheHill newspaper. Additionally, Buis' name appeared frequently on many lists of potential candidates to serve in President Obama's cabinet as Secretary of Agriculture, despite being known primarily as a lobbyist.

On September 19, 2016, Buis was presented with the America’s Fuel award for his work in promoting the ethanol industry.

References

Living people
American lobbyists
Year of birth missing (living people)